Appleton is an unincorporated community in Klickitat County, Washington, United States. Appleton has a post office with ZIP code 98602.

The climate is cooler than lowland areas but still fits in the pattern of humid continental.

References

Unincorporated communities in Klickitat County, Washington
Unincorporated communities in Washington (state)